Thomas Carl Klawitter (born June 24, 1958) is an American former professional baseball pitcher. He appeared in seven games, including two starts, without a decision.

Klawitter was a physical education teacher at Parker High School in Janesville, Wisconsin for 29 years, until his retirement in June 2015. He has also been a coach or assistant coach at the high school level. He was the head varsity girls' basketball coach at Parker for 26 seasons, guiding his teams to 16 conference titles, 12 state appearances, and 3 state championships. He was the AP state coach of the year for the 1992–93 season. Klawitter ranked fifth in number of wins for Wisconsin high school girls' basketball coaches (as of the 2014–15 season), with a 564–128 record.

Klawitter served as an assistant coach with the UW–Whitewater baseball team. He had previously been an assistant with both Janesville Parkers and Janesville Craigs high school baseball teams.

Klawitter was inducted into the Wisconsin State League, (also known as the Wisconsin State Baseball League), in 2007.

References

Sources

Major League Baseball pitchers
Minnesota Twins players
Lethbridge Dodgers players
Lodi Dodgers players
San Antonio Dodgers players
Wisconsin Rapids Twins players
Toledo Mud Hens players
Knoxville Blue Jays players
Baseball players from Wisconsin
Sportspeople from La Crosse, Wisconsin
Wisconsin–La Crosse Eagles baseball players
1958 births
Living people
Wisconsin–Whitewater Warhawks baseball coaches
High school baseball coaches in the United States